Michael Henderson (born 15 March 1932) is an English journalist and the author of ten books, the latest being No Enemy To Conquer – Forgiveness in An Unforgiving World with a foreword by the Dalai Lama.  His books on forgiveness are regularly used in academic courses on conflict resolution. He lives in Westward Ho! in North Devon, England.

He was born in Ealing, London. Due to evacuation he attended many schools: Durston House and Ripley Court in Britain,  Milton Academy Junior School and Rectory School in the United States, and The Hall School and Mill Hill School after he returned to England.

From 1979 to 2000 he also lived in Portland, Oregon where he was president of the World Affairs Council, the English-Speaking Union and Willamette Writers. 

In the US he was a columnist for The Oregonian and The Christian Science Monitor and Union Jack and contributed op-ed articles to many papers including  the Los Angeles Times, the St. Louis Post-Dispatch, the Milwaukee Journal, The Plain Dealer and the Washington Times.

He was a London correspondent  for the Religion News Service, the West Indian Digest and Himmat and had articles published in dozens of papers around the world including the Jamaican Sunday Gleaner, the Japanese Mainichi Daily News, Hong Kong’s South China Morning Post, Canada’s Calgary Herald, and the Nigeria's The Guardian.

His books include All Her Paths Are Peace – Women Pioneers in Peacemaking, The Forgiveness Factor- Stories of Hope in a World of Conflict  and Forgiveness: Breaking the Chain of Hate. 

He is also the author of the autobiographical See You After the Duration – the Story of British Evacuees to North America in World War II. He and his brother, Gerald, spent five years at that time in the United States. 

He was for 35 years on the British Council of The Oxford Group and 20 years on the American board of Moral Re-Armament, now both known as Initiatives of Change and worked in more than twenty countries in the last 50 years.

References

External links
Michael Henderson website
Initiatives of Change

Writers from Portland, Oregon
Living people
1932 births
The Oregonian people